John F. Meade (September 20, 1819 – May 6, 1850) was a farmer, land speculator and politician from Green Bay, Wisconsin who served a single one-year term as a Democratic member of the Wisconsin State Assembly from Brown County during the 1849 session (2nd Wisconsin Legislature) and held various other public offices in the Territory and State of Wisconsin.

Background 
Meade was born in Harrisburg, Pennsylvania on September 20, 1819, son of David P. Meade and Lydia (Wilde) Meade (both natives of Dublin).
His mother died in 1829, leaving two sons and two daughters. The girls went to stay with relatives, then into a residential school. In 1834, John's oldest sister Catherine moved to Green Bay in the Wisconsin Territory to teach at a newly-established Catholic parochial school there. She was soon married, and brought her father and all her siblings to Wisconsin with dispatch. Their father and sister Mary Elizabeth ended up in Kaukana, and after many years of political activity in Brown County and the City of Green Bay, brother Matthew would eventually retire there as well.
 
In May, 1839 John Meade was among those residents of Wisconsin Territory who signed a petition to hold regional and then territory-conventions to nominate candidates for Delegate to Congress. In the October 1841 general election, he was elected as the Democratic candidate for county clerk with a 55-vote margin of victory. His name recurs under that title on legal notices in 1842, 1843, and 1844; and we may reasonably suspect that he had been re-elected. In September 1844 he was again elected on the Democratic ticket as County Clerk for Brown County.

On November 6, 1841 in Brown County, he married Mary "Polly" Lawe (born in Brown County in 1821), daughter of Judge John Lawe, fur trader and associate judge for Brown County, who had come from Canada in 1797, and of Sophia Therese Rankin (of Canadian and Menominee descent). Judge Lawe had been responsible for bringing Catherine to Wisconsin, and she had married his son George W. Lawe in 1835. On December 7, 1842, John was appointed Assistant Clerk of the House of Representatives of the Wisconsin Territory.

He served as the "register" (head) of the General Land Office in Menasha, Wisconsin from March 8, 1847 to June 15, 1848. "The long shelves were loaded down with massive tomes containing the land descriptions and the history of each quarter section with maps and diagrams of hundreds of thousands of acres, and the corners were piled high with boxes and barrels of letters and documents, the accumulation of half a century.... In these dingy, dirty, dark dens were transacted land sales of half Wisconsin, of fabulous value now; and for which the receiver of the land office took in over the pine board counter... the daily receipts of which he kept in a tin pan of a safe that could have been cracked open with a hammer."

On September 7, 1848, he sold 149.18 acres of undeveloped land to the group seeking to establish what would become Lawrence University (that tract included all of what would later become the business district of Appleton, Wisconsin), under the condition that the University be built somewhere upon that land and remain there.

In the Legislature 
In the fall of 1848, he was elected to represent Brown County, replacing fellow Democrat David Agry. When he assumed office in the Assembly in January 1849, he is reported to have been 28 years old, a farmer originally from Pennsylvania who had been in Wisconsin twelve years. He was succeeded for the 1850 session by fellow Democrat Charles D. Robinson.

Personal life and death 
On March 9, 1849, he received $150 on behalf of his wife and two sons, payments being distributed to persons of Menominee blood under the terms of Article 4 of the treaty of October 18, 1848, between the United States and the Menominee Indians.
In February 1850 he was one of nine investors in The Two Rivers and Green Bay Plank Road Company, with a capital stock of $100,000 to build a
plank road from Two Rivers to Green Bay.

On May 6, 1850, a house in a local shanty town burnt down, and the body of Meade was discovered in the rubble. Contemporary accounts differed as to what had happened to him, but his gold watch was missing, and locals asserted that he had been robbed and murdered, and that his body had been discovered under a pile of straw.

References 

1819 births
1852 deaths
19th-century American politicians
Farmers from Wisconsin
Democratic Party members of the Wisconsin State Assembly
People from Green Bay, Wisconsin
People from Harrisburg, Pennsylvania
County clerks in Wisconsin
People murdered in Wisconsin
Businesspeople from Wisconsin